Bhano Langa is a village in Kapurthala District of Punjab State in India.

Villages in Kapurthala district